Martti Eliel Pokela (23 January 1924 – 23 August 2007) was a Finnish folk musician and composer. Pokela was an expert with the kantele, Finland's national musical instrument.

Life and career
Pokela and his wife, Marjatta Pokela, were widely credited with ushering in a revival in interest in Finnish folk music beginning in the 1950s. Their daughter, Eveliina Pokela, began performing with them in the 1960s.

Pokela merged traditional Finnish folk music with contemporary sounds. The family's albums have also been released outside of Finland.

Pokela taught kantele playing at the Sibelius Academy in Helsinki and Kuopio until 1987. He was the founder of the academy's folk music department, where he was named a full professor in 1980.

He is buried in the Hietaniemi Cemetery in Helsinki.

Albums
 Keskiyön Auringon Lauluja (1969)
 Best of Kantele (1995)
 Sonata For Kantele (1996)
 Snow Kantele (1998)
 "Tuulikumpu" (2001)
 Improsette by Martti Pokela (2005)

See also
Music of Finland

References

External links
 YLE News: "Finland's Kantele Master Martti Pokela Dies"
 Finnish Music Centre: "Martti Pokela dies at 83"

1924 births
2007 deaths
People from Haapavesi
Finnish composers
Finnish male composers
Finnish musicologists
Academic staff of Sibelius Academy
Kantele players
Burials at Hietaniemi Cemetery
20th-century Finnish musicians
20th-century musicologists
20th-century male musicians